Émile Justin Louis Combes (6 September 183525 May 1921) was a French statesman and freemason who led the Bloc des gauches's cabinet from June 1902 to January 1905.

Career
Émile Combes was born in Roquecourbe, Tarn. He studied for the priesthood, but abandoned the idea before ordination.  His anti-clericalism would later lead him into becoming a Freemason. He was also in later life a spiritualist. He later took a diploma as a doctor of letters (1860). Then he studied medicine, taking his degree in 1867, and setting up in practice at Pons in Charente-Inférieure. In 1881 he presented himself as a political candidate for Saintes, but was defeated. In 1885 he was elected to the senate by the départment of Charente-Inférieure. He sat in the Democratic left, and was elected vice-president in 1893 and 1894. The reports which he drew up upon educational questions drew attention to him, and on 3 November 1895 he entered the Leon Victor Auguste Bourgeois cabinet as minister of public instruction, resigning with his colleagues on 21 April following.

Prime minister
He actively supported the Waldeck-Rousseau ministry, and upon its retirement in 1902 he was himself charged with the formation of a cabinet. In this he took the portfolio of the Interior, and the main energy of the government was devoted to an anti-clerical agenda. The parties of the Left, united upon this question in the Bloc republicain, supported Combes in his application of the law of 1901 on the religious associations, and voted the new bill on the congregations (1904). Under his guidance France  took the first definite steps toward the separation of church and state. By 1904, through his efforts, nearly 10,000 religious schools had been closed, and thousands of priests and nuns left France rather than be persecuted.

Combes was vigorously opposed by all the conservative parties, who saw the mass closure of church schools as a persecution of religion. Combes led the anti-clerical coalition on the left, facing opposition primarily organized by the pro-Catholic party Action libérale populaire (ALP). ALP had a stronger popular base, with better financing and a stronger network of newspapers, but had far fewer seats in the Chamber of Deputies.

Among people who looked with favor on his stubborn enforcement of the law, he was familiarly called le petit père. In October 1904, his Minister of War, General André, was uncovered 'republicanizing' the army. He took the promotion process out of the hands of senior officers and handled it directly as a political matter. He used Freemasons to spy on the religious behavior of all 19,000 officers; they flagged the observant Catholics and André made sure they would not be promoted. Exposed as the Affaire Des Fiches, the scandal undermined support for the Combes government.  It also undermined morale in the army, as officers realized that hostile spies examining their private lives were more important to their careers than their own professional accomplishments.

Finally the defection of the Radical and Socialist groups induced him to resign on 17 January 1905, although he had not met an adverse vote in the Chamber. His policy was still carried on; and when the law of the separation of church and state was passed, all the leaders of the Radical parties entertained him at a noteworthy banquet in which they openly recognized him as the real originator of the movement.

Later life
The campaign for the separation of church and state was the last big political action in his life. While still possessed of great influence over extreme Radicals, Combes took but little public part in politics after his resignation of the premiership in 1905. He joined the Aristide Briand ministry of October 1915 as one of the five Elder Statesmen, but without portfolio.

According to Geoffrey Kurtz, the years of Émile Combes' administration were a period of social reform "without equal" during the era of the Third Republic, which included such reforms as an eight-hour day for miners, a ten-hour day for many workers, the lowering of mandatory military service from 3 to 2 years, the elimination of certain middle-class draft exemptions, and some modest public assistance for the chronically ill, the disabled, and the elderly. In 1903, safety standards were extended to shops and offices.

Combes died 25 May 1921 in Pons, Charente-Maritime.

Combes's Ministry, 7 June 190224 January 1905
Émile Combes – President of the Council and Minister of the Interior and Worship
Théophile Delcassé – Minister of Foreign Affairs
Louis André – Minister of War
Maurice Rouvier – Minister of Finance
Ernest Vallé – Minister of Justice
Charles Camille Pelletan – Minister of Marine
Joseph Chaumié – Minister of Public Instruction and Fine Arts
Léon Mougeot – Minister of Agriculture
Gaston Doumergue – Minister of Colonies
Émile Maruéjouls – Minister of Public Works
Georges Trouillot – Minister of Commerce, Industry, Posts, and Telegraphs

Changes
15 November 1904 – Maurice Berteaux succeeds André as Minister of War

Notes

Further reading
 Akan, Murat. The Politics of Secularism: Religion, Diversity, and Institutional Change in France and Turkey (2017).
 Arnal, Oscar L. "Why the French Christian Democrats Were Condemned." Church History 49.2 (1980): 188–202. online
 Coffey, Joan L. "Of Catechisms and Sermons: Church-State Relations in France, 1890–1905." Church history 66.1 (1997): 54–66.  online
 McManners, John. Church and State in France, 1870–1914 (Harper & Row, 1972), pp. 125–55.
 Mayeur, Jean-Marie Mayeur and Madeleine Rebérioux. The Third Republic from its Origins to the Great War, 1871-1914 (1984), pp. 227–44
 Merle, Gabriel. Emile Combes (1995), p. 1, 662 p.; standard biography, in French
 Partin, Malcolm. Waldeck-Rousseau, Combes, and the Church: the Politics of Anticlericalism, 1899–1905 (1969)
 Sabatier, Paul. Disestablishment in France (1906) online

External links
 Cartoons

1835 births
1921 deaths
Catholicism and Freemasonry
French Freemasons
French interior ministers
French Senators of the Third Republic
French spiritualists
Government ministers of France
Honorary Knights Grand Cross of the Royal Victorian Order
People from Tarn (department)
Politicians from Occitania (administrative region)
Politics of France
Prime Ministers of France
Radical Party (France) politicians
Senators of Charente-Maritime
State ministers of France
Politicians awarded knighthoods